Mmhonlümo Kikon (born 1 May 1978) is an Indian politician, poet, former social worker from Nagaland. He is a member of the Bharatiya Janata Party (BJP) and is currently a member of the Nagaland Legislative Assembly from 40 Bhandari Constituency in Wokha District.

Kikon has published two books of poems since 2018. He completed his master's degree in English Literature from Delhi University. He is a second term MLA from Nagaland. He is also an ASPEN Fellow.

A former Minister in the Government of Nagaland, he now holds the position of Advisor to the Government of Nagaland on Information Technology and Communication, New & Renewable Energy, Science & Technology. He was appointed the National Spokesperson of the BJP. He was given additional responsibility as the Prabhari (in-Charge) of Mizoram state of the BJP.

Early life 
Mmhonlümo Kikon was born in Kohima, Nagaland. Kikon completed his schooling from Don Bosco School, Kohima and Kohima Science College. He further received his undergraduate and master's degrees from the University of Delhi. He has been a keen football player right from school to university representing the college and school where he studied. Ever since his college days, he was extremely focused and engaged in working for the welfare of the society at large. He was the co-founder of the Nagaland Chapter Chair of Young Indians of the CII and had a short stint with a publishing firm in Delhi before entering social work and active politics.

By the year 2006, Kikon had founded an NGO called the DICE foundation, which focused primarily on the three key areas of environmental policy, sustainable development and rural women livelihood.  With an aim to push for civil society engagements with the Government of India on the various conflicts and development challenges in the Northeast, he has been instrumental in forming regional coalitions among civil society leaders and young leaders from diverse fields from all the Northeast states and communities.

Kikon has published 2 books of poems under his name (The Village Empire and The Penmi Poems: A Requiem). Indian Olympic boxer and Member of Parliament, Rajya Sabha, Mary Kom formally released the book on "The Village Empire" written by Mmhonlümo Kikon at her residence in New Delhi. He has also travelled extensively to European and Asian Countries attending seminars and workshops on international relations, Climate change and sustainable Development.

Political career 
Mmhonlümo Kikon was first elected into the Nagaland Legislative Assembly in the year 2013. He was re-elected for a second term in the year 2018. Since Nagaland's statehood, he is the only legislator to have won consecutively in this constituency. In his first term, Kikon served as a Parliamentary Secretary for Skill development and Labour, and then served for another six months as a Cabinet Minister for Geology and Mining and Border Affairs. He was appointed the State Election Officer of the BJP for Nagaland state in 2016.

During his second term, Kikon was the Advisor to the Government of Nagaland on Information and Technology, Science & Technology, and New & Renewable Energy. In the year 2018, he was appointed the Chief Whip of the BJP Legislature Party in the Nagaland Legislative Assembly. Kikon was also featured among the Top 50 MLAs in India in a survey conducted by the magazine ‘Fame India’. In 2020, Kikon was appointed a National Spokesperson of the Bharatiya Janata Party. In addition to this, he was also given the responsibility of Prabhari or state in-charge of Mizoram.

References 

People from Kohima
Bharatiya Janata Party politicians from Nagaland
Nagaland MLAs 2013–2018
Living people
Chief Ministers of Nagaland
21st-century Indian politicians
Nationalist Congress Party politicians from Nagaland
1978 births